Saint Anne's Church serves in the Church of England the Soho section of London. It was consecrated on 21 March 1686 by Bishop Henry Compton as the parish church of the new civil and ecclesiastical parish of St Anne, created from part of the parish of St Martin in the Fields. The church is under the Deanery of Westminster (St Margaret) in the Diocese of London.

Parts of its churchyard around its west including tower are now the public park of St Anne's Gardens, accessed from the Shaftesbury Avenue end of Wardour Street. The church is accessed via a gate at that end of Dean Street.

The parish, having spawned new churches to Saints Thomas and Peter in the era of compulsory church attendance, reconsolidated on Saint Anne's in 1945.

History

1677–1799
The parish was dedicated to Saint Anne because Compton had been tutor to Princess Anne before she became Queen. Construction commenced in 1677 on a plot in what was then the countryside of Soho Fields, with William Talman and/or Christopher Wren as architect(s).

In 1699 a tuition-free parish school was founded for boys and in 1704 it started to admit girls. The church received an organ in 1699 from the Dowager-Queen's Chapel in St James's Palace and from 1700 the church's first organist was William Croft (composer of the "Saint Anne" tune to O God, Our Help in Ages Past). That organ (which was by Father Bernard Smith) was removed in 1798 and installed in St Michael Paternoster Royal. The church's tower was only completed in 1718, with the addition of a timber spire by local carpenter John Meard. Edmund Andros was buried in the church's churchyard in 1714 as was the actress Hester Davenport in 1717, while in 1724/5 the church saw the marriage of Edward Harley, 3rd Earl of Oxford and Earl Mortimer, and in 1743 Prince William Henry (younger brother of George III) was baptised here. The actress and dancer Arabella Menage was baptised here in 1782.

1800–1939
The tower, however, became unstable by 1800 and, after 41 meetings of a "Tower Rebuilding Committee" came no closer to solving the problem, the architect Samuel Pepys Cockerell was commissioned to design a replacement. The original tower was demolished (though the 1 ton clock bell, cast in 1691 and still in use, was retained) and the new tower's brickwork was completed by 1801, its bell chamber's Portland stonework by March 1803, and its copper cupola by May 1803. Also placed in the crypt was the body of Thomas Pitt, 2nd Baron Camelford in 1804.

The church's choir and musical, famous since its consecration, continued with Sir Joseph Barnby (later Precentor of Eton), who served as its organist from 1871 to 1888 and introduced the first UK performance of Bach's "Saint John Passion", and with royal command performances (in 1886 for Queen Victoria at Windsor, singing Louis Spohr's "Last Judgement"; and later, at Buckingham Palace, for Queen Alexandra). The first religious service with music broadcast by radio came from this church in the 1920s.

1939–present
The whole church was left burned out on the night of 24 September 1940 during the Blitz, apart from the tower, which was left derelict. St Thomas's Regent Street (now demolished) and the adjoining Saint Anne's House in the "Upper Room" (now known as the "Allen Room") were used for worship from then on. Though Jacques Groag in 1945 proposed keeping the ruins as a war memorial, it was by 1949 assumed that the church would not be rebuilt, so in 1953 the remains of the east wall (the only significant parts left standing) were demolished, the site deconsecrated and prepared for sale and the parish amalgamated with those of the churches of St Thomas's Regent Street and St Peter's Great Windmill Street (creating the Parish of St Anne with St Thomas and St Peter, centred on St Thomas's).

The tower was used as a chapel for a time in the 1950s, partly restored in 1979 by the Soho Society, and fully restored in the 1990–91 rebuilding of the whole church – the tower is now a Grade II* listed building. That reconstruction had been the result of London County Council's policy to keep Soho as a residential area, was facilitated by a new private act of parliament in 1965 allowing the site to be cleared and began in earnest with a foundation stone laid by Princess Anne on 12 March 1990. The new complex was completed in time for an opening and rededication on St Anne's Day, 26 July 1991. The new church and its associated complex is not per se a reconstruction of the old and can be varied from a large to a small space. It is set within a community centre and is a community focus such as for grief surrounding the 1999 Admiral Duncan pub bombing.

Despite the lack of a building at that time, from 1941 to 1958 the St. Anne Society under Father Patrick McLaughlin encouraged links between the literary world and the Church of England, with members such as Fr Gilbert Shaw, J. C. Winnington-Ingram, Charles Williams, Agatha Christie, T. S. Eliot, Fr Max Petitpierre, Dom Gregory Dix, Arnold Bennett, C. S. Lewis and the churchwarden Rose Macaulay. Continuing the work of the church's 18th and 19th century philanthropic rectors, in the 20th and 21st centuries the "Vestry of St Anne's" (now called the Parochial Church Council) has been active in social work with London's poor and homeless (Kenneth Leech founded the charity Centrepoint in St. Anne's House's basement in December 1969 whilst he was assistant priest at St Anne's and it remains based at the church). The Church is currently thriving as a church community and as venue for many local community and charitable events and meetings; it also houses the Soho Society, the archives of MoSoho (the Museum of Soho) and (from June 2016) anti-homophobic bullying charity Diversity Role Models. To celebrate the 25th anniversary of the rebuilding of the church a redesigned entrance on Dean Street was unrevealed on 8 December 2016.

The new entrance was designed by students Lina Viluma and Sherief al Rifa’i, who were chosen as a result of a competition to redesign the entrance of Saint Anne's. The judges of the President's Award for alterations to a church building in the 2017 Church Architecture Awards said that "The design has a strong idea but has been carefully refined employing subtle geometries in the ceiling and joinery. These elements have been combined with a striking lighting scheme to make a dynamic and inviting entrance to the church."

Rectors of St Anne's Church, Soho

1686–1704† John Hearne
1704–1750† John Pelling
1750–1766† Samuel Squire (as Dean of Bristol from 1760, Bishop of St David's from 1761)
1766–1778 Richard Hind
1778–1781† Robert Richardson
1781–1806† Stephen Eaton (as Archdeacon of Middlesex)
1806–1845† Roderick MacLeod
1846–1891 Nugent Wade
1891–1914 John Henry Cardwell
1914–1929† George Clement Wilton
1930–1933 Basil Bourchier (resigned after mountaineering accident or due to scandal)
——
1953–1962 Patrick McLaughlin
1963–1975 John Frear Hester
1978–1984 Michael Barnabas St Leger Hurst-Bannister
1985–1998 Frederick Crichton Stevens
1998–2007 Clare Marguerite Herbert
2007–2011 David Samuel Gilmore (sacked for unbecoming conduct)
2011–2013 William Mungo Jacob
2013– Richard Simon Fildes Buckley

† Rector died in post

See also

 List of Christopher Wren churches in London

References

External links

 Detailed description from the Survey of London online
 Official website of this church; domain: stannes-soho.org.uk
 The Soho Society
 360° Panorama inside the church

Church of England church buildings in the City of Westminster
Christopher Wren church buildings in London
Grade II listed churches in the City of Westminster
Diocese of London
Churches completed in 1686
Soho
Saint Anne's Church
Burial sites of the Pitt family
1686 establishments in England
Saint Anne